Brak (sometimes written Biraq or Birak is a town in the Wadi al Shatii District in west-central Libya. It is the administrative center of the district.

Overview
The town has a population of 39,444 and is home to a technical college of Sabha University. Much of the new development in the town is occurring to the north of the old town center, which features gardens and forts from the Italian and Ottoman eras.

The technical college "Faculty of Engineering and Technology", now a college of Sebha University, was previously known as the "Higher Institute of Technology", and it is this college that gives much value to the town, as it is a well-known research and academic organization. The college comprises ten distinct departments; six of which are specialized in the engineering arm of the college, namely:
Department of Electronic & Electrical Engineering
Department of Civil Engineering
Department of Petroleum Engineering
Department of Chemistry and materials science
Department of design and architecture
Department of Mechanical Engineering.

The other arm, the technical arm, has three departments:
Department of Medical Lab Technology
Department of Food Science Technology
Department of Environmental Sciences 
Department of General Sciences.

Graduates of this college are considered the best in the country, as the academic and technical rank of this college is both prestigious and well-known.  There are plans to expand this college more to accommodate more students and staff and to have more departments and specialties.

See also 
 List of cities in Libya

References

 
Populated places in Wadi al Shatii District